Western Magic Australian Football Club is an Australian rules football club based in the western Sydney suburbs. The club fields teams across the Men's, Women's & under 19s competitions.

History 
In 2012 the Magic fielded a solitary team in the Division 3 competition, finishing runners up in their inaugural season to the UTS Bats.
In 2013 they expanded to 2 sides - a Division 3 and a Division 5 side. The Division 3 side finished Minor Premiers and went on to win the Grand Final against Randwick City Saints by 10 points. This earned the side a promotion to Division 2.
In 2014 the Division 5 side finished 4th at the end of the regular season. A late season charge saw them win the Grand Final over local rivals Penrith to claim the club's 2nd premiership. The Division 2 side finished Runners Up, losing the Grand Final to minor premiers Sydney University. The club highlight is Daniel Lim getting 27 votes and finishing Runner Up in the 2014 Division 2 B&F.
In 2015, the club added its first Women's team, who qualified for the finals in their first season. The Men's division 2 side made amends for the previous season, defeating Camden by 8 points in the Grand Final. This earns the club promotion to Division 1.
In 2016, the club fielded its first Under 19s team, who would go on to reach the grand final.

In 2017, the Magic bid farewell to president John Clifford, and Mark Barclay was voted in as his successor. The club will be coached by Jack Schwarze (Seniors), Anthony Hyland (Reserves), John Dimond (Women's) and Daniel Armstrong (19s).

The Magic won the 2018 AFL Sydney Women's grand final over the Wollongong Saints.

References

External links
  
 
 Western Magic at AustralianFootball.com

Australian rules football clubs in Sydney
Australian rules football clubs established in 2012
2012 establishments in Australia